Behabad County is in Yazd province, Iran. The capital of the county is the city of Behabad. At the 2006 census, the region's population (as Behabad District of Bafq County) was 14,577 in 3,564 households. The following census in 2011 counted 15,331 people in 4,523 households, by which time the district had been separated from the county to form Behabad County. At the 2016 census, the county's population was 17,221 in 5,380 households.

Administrative divisions

The population history and structural changes of Behabad County's administrative divisions over three consecutive censuses are shown in the following table. The latest census shows two districts, three rural districts, and one city.

References

 

Counties of Yazd Province